Alvania scrobiculata is a species of minute sea snail, marine gastropod mollusk or micromollusk in the family Rissoidae.

Distribution
 European waters
 North West Atlantic

Description 
The maximum recorded shell length is 3.4 mm.

Habitat 
Minimum recorded depth is 22 m. Maximum recorded depth is 574 m.

References

Rissoidae
Gastropods described in 1842